The  is a Japanese railway line in Gunma Prefecture, between Takasaki Station in Takasaki and Shimonita Station in Shimonita, operated by the private railway operator . This is the only line operated by the company, although it also operates a few bus lines. The first section of the line opened in 1897.

Rolling stock
, the following rolling stock is used on the line.

 150 series 2-car EMUs x3 (former Seibu Railway EMUs)
 200/250 series single-car and two-car EMUs
 500 series 2-car EMUs x2 (former Seibu Railway EMUs)
 700 series 2-car EMUs (former JR East 107 series EMUs; since March 2019)
 1000 series 2-car EMU x1
 6000 series 2-car EMU x1
 7000 series 2-car EMU x1 (since December 2013)
 Class DeKi 1 electric locomotives DeKi 1 and 3 (built by Siemens)
 Class ED31 electric locomotive ED31 6 (former JNR Class ED31)

The 1000 and 6000 series EMUs purchased new are unusual in having the driver's seat on the right-hand side facing the direction of travel.

History

Freight operations on the line were discontinued from 1 October 1994.

On 30 November 2003, Takasaki Fairy Land which was a leisure complex being established as "Kappa Pia" in 1961 was discontinued. In this leisure complex, "NAKASONE FESTIVAL" was held during summer because "Matsugoro Nakasone" who is a father of Yasuhiro Nakasone was a CEO of Joshi Electric Railway.

Stations

See also
List of railway companies in Japan
List of railway lines in Japan

References

External links 

  

Railway lines in Japan
Rail transport in Gunma Prefecture
Railway lines opened in 1897
1067 mm gauge railways in Japan
2 ft 6 in gauge railways in Japan